Franc Červan (14 October 1936 – 7 November 1991) was a Yugoslav long-distance runner. He competed in the men's 5000 metres and men's 10000 metres at the 1964 Summer Olympics.

References

1936 births
1991 deaths
Athletes (track and field) at the 1964 Summer Olympics
Yugoslav male long-distance runners
Olympic athletes of Yugoslavia
Place of birth missing
Mediterranean Games silver medalists for Yugoslavia
Mediterranean Games medalists in athletics
Athletes (track and field) at the 1963 Mediterranean Games